St. Anne Melkite Greek Catholic Cathedral in the North Hollywood neighborhood of Los Angeles, is a modern cathedral inspired by Byzantine architecture.  It is the co-cathedral church of the Melkite Greek Catholic Eparchy of Newton, which encompasses the entire United States.

Parish church
Saint Anne Cathedral was founded in 1909 when Father Gerasimos Sawaya, the first Melkite missionary priest, traversed the west coast visiting and ministering to the Melkites in the Western United States.  St. Anne Cathedral was the Mother Church of the following Melkite communities founded from it: Holy Cross Church in Placentia, CA; Virgin Mary Mission in Temecula, CA; St. Jacob Mission in San Diego, CA; St. Philip Mission in San Bernardino, CA; St. Paul Mission in West Los Angeles, CA; and Annunciation Mission in Covina, CA. In addition, St. Anne Church was also involved with the foundation of the following communities: St. George Church in Sacramento, CA; St. Elias the Prophet Church in San Jose, CA; and St. John of the Desert Church in Phoenix, AZ; and St. Joseph Mission in Seattle, WA.

From parish church to cathedral
On May 20, 2015, Pope Francis named Saint Anne Melkite Greek Catholic Church in Los Angeles, California, as Co-Cathedral of the Melkite Greek Catholic Eparchy of Newton.

Later events
In 1976, the Melkite Greek Catholic Church in the United States was elevated from the status of an Exarchate to that of an Eparchy.  On May 8, 1977, at a Patriarchal Liturgy served at the cathedral, the Melkite Greek Catholic Eparchy of Newton was canonically erected with Archbishop Joseph Tawil as Eparch.

See also
 Melkite Greek Catholic Eparchy of Newton
List of Catholic cathedrals in the United States
List of cathedrals in the United States

References

External links
 St. Anne Melkite Catholic Cathedral Official Site

Christian organizations established in 1908
Roman Catholic churches completed in 1965
Churches in Boston
Melkite Greek Catholic cathedrals
Eastern Catholic cathedrals in the United States
Melkite Greek Catholic churches in the United States
Eastern Catholic churches in California
Lebanese-American culture in California
1909 establishments in California
20th-century Roman Catholic church buildings in the United States